David Eseli Simiyu is a Kenyan politician. He belongs to FORD-Kenya and was elected to represent the Kimilili Constituency in the National Assembly of Kenya since the 2007 Kenyan parliamentary election.

References

Living people
Kenyan Luhya people
Year of birth missing (living people)
Forum for the Restoration of Democracy – Kenya politicians
Members of the National Assembly (Kenya)